Tara Strong (née Charendoff) is a Canadian-American actress who has provided voice-work for animation and video games and has performed in live-action. Her roles include animated series such as Rugrats, The Powerpuff Girls, The Fairly OddParents, Teen Titans, Wow Wow Wubbzy! and My Little Pony: Friendship Is Magic and video games such as Mortal Kombat X, Final Fantasy X-2 and the Batman: Arkham series. She has earned nominations from the Annie Awards and Daytime Emmys and an award from the Academy of Interactive Arts & Sciences.
In 2004, she had won an Interactive Achievement Award for her role as Rikku in Final Fantasy X-2. She also served as the announcer for the 1999 Kids' Choice Awards, appeared as a guest panelist at several fan conventions (including BotCon, Jacon, Comic-Con International and Anime Overdose) and was featured on the front cover of the July/August 2004 issue of Working Mother magazine, in which she said, "My son is now old enough to respond to my work. To me, that's what it is all about." Strong has earned five Annie Award nominations.

In 2013, Strong won the Shorty Award for "Best #Actress" for her use of social media. The Behind the Voice Actors website selected her for a BTVA Voice Acting Award for Voice Actress of the Year for 2013 and nominated her for the 2011 and 2012 years.

Filmography

Animation

Feature films

Direct-to-video and television films

Video games

Live-action

Notes

References

Book references
 
 
 
 
 

Actress filmographies